IHF World Men's Outdoor Handball Championship was the world championship of field handball and was organized by the International Handball Federation (IHF) in the period 1948–1966. The first edition was organized by the International Amateur Handball Federation (IAHF) the predecessor of the IHF. In total, seven editions were held. West Germany and East Germany did not participate in the 1948 championship due to the end of World War II.

Tournament

1: Germany sent a united team composed of players from the GDR and the FRG.

Medal table

National team appearances in the IHF World Championship

Comprehensive team results by tournament
Source: IHF official site.

See also
IHF World Women's Outdoor Handball Championship
IHF World Men's Handball Championship

References

External links
Official website

 
IHF World Men's Outdoor Handball Championship
Men's
World